Sir Matthew White Ridley, 3rd Baronet (18 April 1778 – 14 July 1836) was a politician in the United Kingdom.  He was Member of Parliament (MP) for Newcastle-upon-Tyne from 1813 until his death in 1836.

He inherited the baronetcy on the death in 1813 of his father Matthew, and was in turn succeeded by his eldest son Matthew. His younger son, George, also sat in Parliament for Newcastle (1856–1860). His daughter Janetta Maria Ridley married Isaac Cookson and emigrated with him to New Zealand where her husband became a Member of Parliament.

References 

ThePeerage.com

External links 

1778 births
1836 deaths
Ridley, Matthew, 3rd Baronet
Members of the Parliament of the United Kingdom for English constituencies
UK MPs 1812–1818
UK MPs 1818–1820
UK MPs 1820–1826
UK MPs 1826–1830
UK MPs 1830–1831
UK MPs 1831–1832
UK MPs 1832–1835
UK MPs 1835–1837
Matthew
Whig (British political party) MPs for English constituencies